

Flamengo Squad changes (2010)
List of all Clube de Regatas do Flamengo transfers in the 2010 season.

In

Out

References

List of Flamengo transfers 2010